The 2017 NBL Finals was the championship series of the 2016–17 NBL season and the conclusion of the season. Perth Wildcats defeated Illawarra Hawks in three games (3-0) to claim their eighth NBL championship.

Format
The 2016–17 National Basketball League Finals were played in February and March 2017 between the top four teams of the regular season, consisting of two best-of-three semi-final and one best-of-five final series, where the higher seed hosted the first, third and fifth games.

Qualification

Qualified teams

Ladder

Seedings
 Adelaide 36ers
 Cairns Taipans
 Perth Wildcats
 Illawarra Hawks

The NBL tie-breaker system as outlined in the NBL Rules and Regulations states that in the case of an identical win–loss record, the results in games played between the teams will determine order of seeding.

Bracket

Semi-finals series

(1) Adelaide 36ers vs (4) Illawarra Hawks

Regular season series

Illawarra won 3–1 in the regular season series:

(2) Cairns Taipans vs (3) Perth Wildcats

Regular season series

Tied 2–2 in the regular season series; 323-317 points differential to Perth:

Grand Final series

(3) Perth Wildcats vs (4) Illawarra Hawks

Regular season series

Tied 2–2 in the regular season series; 336-330 points differential to Perth:

See also
 2016–17 NBL season

References

Finals
National Basketball League (Australia) Finals